Aedh Ua Con Ceannainn (died 1119) was King of Uí Díarmata.

Overview

The Annals of the Four Masters simply state that "Aedh Ua Conceannainn, lord of Ui-Diarmada, died." No contemporary annal gives any more detail, and the precise succession over much of the next century is not clear.

References

 Vol. 2 (AD 903–1171): edition and translation
 Annals of Ulster at CELT: Corpus of Electronic Texts at University College Cork
 Annals of Tigernach at CELT: Corpus of Electronic Texts at University College Cork
Revised edition of McCarthy's synchronisms at Trinity College Dublin.

People from County Galway
1119 deaths
12th-century Irish monarchs
Year of birth unknown